Parmeliopsis is a genus of lichens in the family  Parmeliaceae. The genus contains two species. Members of this genus are commonly called bran lichens.

References

Parmeliaceae
Lichen genera
Taxa named by William Nylander (botanist)
Lecanorales genera